New York City is the third album by electronica group Brazilian Girls, released in 2008.

Brazilian Girls received a Grammy nomination for Best Dance Recording in 2009. Daft Punk ended up winning the Grammy for the live album Alive 2007.

Track listing
 "St. Petersburg"
 "Losing Myself"
 "Berlin"
 "Strangeboy"
 "Good Time"
 "Nouveau Americain"
 "L'Interprete"
 "Internacional" (Barry Reynolds, Baaba Maal)
 "Ricardo"
 "I Want Out"
 "Mano de Dios"

External links
 New York City at Verve Forecast website

Brazilian Girls albums
2008 albums